Pseudoruegeria aquimaris is a Gram-negative, rod-shaped and non-motile bacterium from the genus of Pseudoruegeria which has been isolated from seawater from the coast of Hwajinpo from the Sea of Japan in Korea.

References

External links
Type strain of Pseudoruegeria aquimaris at BacDive -  the Bacterial Diversity Metadatabase

Rhodobacteraceae
Bacteria described in 2007